Marko Luka Maletic (born June 23, 1999) is a Canadian soccer player who currently plays for Guelph United in League1 Ontario.

Early life
Maletic began playing soccer at age six with Kitchener SC. Afterwards he played for Waterloo Minor SC, Mississauga Falcons, and ProStars FC, while also playing with the Ontario provincial team. In 2015, he moved to Croatia and joined the Dinamo Zagreb Academy. In 2016, he returned to Canada and joined the Toronto FC Academy. In 2017, he returned to Croatia and joined the youth system of HNK Hajduk Split.

Club career
In 2016, he played for Toronto FC III in both League1 Ontario and the Premier Development League.

In July 2016, Maletic was promoted to Toronto FC II and made his professional debut on July 10 against the Harrisburg City Islanders. He did not return to the side in 2017.

In 2018, Maletic began playing for League1 Ontario side FC London, where he made fourteen regular season appearances and one playoff appearance. That season, he was a starter for the mid-season all-star game for the League1 Ontario All-Stars against the PLSQ All-Stars. At the end of the season, he was named the League1 Ontario Co-Young Player of the Year and was named a First Team All-Star. In 2019, he made seven league appearances.

During the 2019-2020 season, he played for Croatian club NK Špansko, followed by NK Trnje.

In July 2020, he joined NK Karlovac. He departed the club in early February 2021.

In 2021, he returned to FC London, making ten league appearances.

In 2022, he joined Guelph United F.C. in League1 Ontario, with whom he played in the 2022 Canadian Championship against HFX Wanderers FC. He made nine league appearances in League1 Ontario.

International career
In 2014, he attended a camp with the Canada U15 team.

In March 2015, he was called up to the Croatia U16 team, with whom he played two matches.

References

External links 
 
 
 

1999 births
Living people
Association football defenders
Canadian soccer players
Canada men's youth international soccer players
Canadian people of Croatian descent
Soccer people from Ontario
Sportspeople from Kitchener, Ontario
GNK Dinamo Zagreb players
Toronto FC players
Toronto FC II players
HNK Hajduk Split players
League1 Ontario players
USL Championship players
Waterloo United players
ProStars FC players
Guelph United F.C. players
NK Karlovac players